Bewitching the Pomerania is the second EP by Polish extreme metal band Behemoth. It was released in 1997 by Solistitium Records. It was recorded at P.J. Studios in February 1997 and mastered at Vox Mortiis Studio. The EP is the first release of the band to feature Zbigniew Robert "Inferno" Promiński on drums. Bewitching the Pomerania also marks the band's passage from black metal music to a style more similar to death metal. All three tracks were included on the 2005 re-release of Behemoth's debut EP, And the Forests Dream Eternally.

On Behemoth's official webpage Nergal stated that the artwork for Bewitching the Pomerania is "by far the worst Behemoth artwork of all time". It is also the first release to showcase Behemoth's new logo from the Old English text to its present form.

Track listing

Personnel

Release history

References

1997 EPs
Behemoth (band) EPs
Albums produced by Adam Darski